The 2022–23 European windstorm season is the eighth season of the European windstorm naming in Europe. The new season's storm names were announced on 1 September 2022. Storms that occur up until 31 August 2023 will be included in this season. This was the fourth season where the Netherlands participated, alongside the United Kingdom's Met Office and Ireland's Met Éireann in the western group. The Portuguese, Spanish, French and Belgian meteorological agencies collaborated for the sixth time, joined by Luxembourg's agency (South-western Group). This is the second season where Greece, Israel and Cyprus (Eastern Mediterranean group), and Italy, Slovenia, Croatia, Montenegro, North Macedonia and Malta (Central Mediterranean Group) named storms which affected their areas.

Background and naming 

In 2015, the Met Office and Met Éireann announced a project to name storms as part of the "Name our Storms" project for windstorms and asked the public for suggestions. The meteorological offices produced a full list of names for 2015–2016 through 2017–2018, common to both the United Kingdom and Ireland, with the Netherlands taking part from 2019 onwards. Names in the United Kingdom will be based on the National Severe Weather Warning Service.

Definitions and naming conventions 

There is no universal definition of what constitutes a windstorm in Europe, nor is there a universally accepted system of naming storms. For example, in the Western Group, consisting of the UK, Ireland, and the Netherlands, a storm is named if one of the meteorological agencies in those countries issues an orange warning (amber in the UK), which generally requires a likelihood of widespread sustained wind speeds greater than 65 km/h, or widespread wind gust speeds over 110 km/h. (Required wind speeds vary slightly by agency and by season.) Both the likelihood of impact and the potential severity of the system are considered when naming a storm. The Southwest Group of Spain, Portugal, and France share a similar storm-naming scheme, though their names differ from those used by the Western Group. In Greece, however, naming criteria were established for storms when the storm's forecasted winds are above 50 km/h over land, with the wind expected to have a significant impact to infrastructures. In Denmark, a windstorm must have an hourly average windspeed of at least 90 km/h (25 m/s).

The Meteorology Department of the Free University of Berlin (FUB) names all high and low pressure systems that affect Europe, though they do not assign names to any actual storms. A windstorm that is associated with one of these pressure systems will at times be recognized by the name assigned to the associated pressure system by the FUB. Named windstorms that have been recognized by a European meteorological agency are described in this article.

Naming conventions used in Europe are generally based on conditions that are forecast, not conditions that have actually occurred, as public awareness and preparedness are often cited as the main purpose of the naming schemes–for example, a reference. Therefore, an assignment of a storm name does not mean that a storm will actually develop.

There are two main naming lists: one created by the national meteorological agencies of the United Kingdom, Ireland, and the Netherlands, and another created by the equivalent agencies from France, Spain, Portugal, and Belgium. Additionally, former Atlantic hurricanes will retain their names as assigned by the National Hurricane Center of the United States.

Western Group (United Kingdom, Ireland and the Netherlands) 
The following names were chosen for the 2022–23 season in the United Kingdom, Ireland, and the Netherlands. For a windstorm to be named, the United Kingdom's Met Office, Ireland's Met Eireann, and the Netherlands KNMI have to issue an amber weather warning, preferably for wind, but a storm can also be named for amber warnings of rain and snow (e.g. Storm Arwen in 2021).

South-western Group (France, Spain, Portugal, Belgium and Luxembourg) 
This was the sixth year in which the meteorological agencies of France, Spain and Portugal named storms that affected their areas.

Eastern Mediterranean Group (Greece, Israel and Cyprus) 
The following names were chosen for the 2022–23 season in Greece, Israel and Cyprus.

Central Mediterranean Group (Italy, Slovenia, Croatia, Montenegro, Albania and Malta) 
The following names were chosen for the 2022–23 season in Italy, Slovenia, Croatia, Montenegro, Albania and Malta.

Northern Group (Iceland, Denmark, Norway, Finland and Sweden)
This naming group, like the naming from the Free University of Berlin, does not use a naming list but names storms when it has not received a name by any other meteorological service in Europe and is projected to affect Iceland, Denmark, Norway, Finland or Sweden.

Central & Southern Group (Germany, Switzerland, Liechtenstein and Austria) 
The Free University of Berlin names storms based on low pressures across the continent and does not use a naming list.

Ex-Atlantic Hurricane
One former Atlantic hurricane transitioned into an European windstorm and retained its name as assigned by the National Hurricane Center in Miami, Florida:

Season summary 

All storms named by European meteorological organisations in their respective forecasting areas, as well as Atlantic hurricanes that transitioned into European windstorms and retained the name assigned by the National Hurricane Center:

Storms

Ex-Hurricane Danielle  

The remnants of Hurricane Danielle became an extratropical cyclone that affected Portugal and parts of western Spain. It had formerly been a category 1 hurricane that transitioned into a post-tropical cyclone on 8 September, north of the Azores. It dissipated off the coast of Portugal on 15 September.

Large waves and heavy rainfall hit the Azores. Ex-Danielle brought heavy rain to mainland Portugal while meandering near its coast. Between 12 and 13 September, 644 accidents were reported throughout the country. While many downed trees and flash floods were reported, no fatalities resulted from the downpours. In Manteigas, under a "state of calamity" at the time, following intense summer forest fires in nearby areas of the Serra da Estrela mountain range, floods and landslides caused major damage. Four vehicles were dragged into the Zêzere River. Heavy rain extended to as far north as Braga. Covilhã saw  of rain while Viseu saw  of rain. Minor wind and flooding damage was reported in both Lisbon and Setúbal. Much of Spain was put on yellow alert as wind, rain and thunderstorms triggered by the cyclone moved inland.

Storm Ana (Reili) 

Storm Ana was named on 15 September by the Italian Meteorological Service, with the same storm receiving the name Reili from the Free University of Berlin. The storm caused devastating floods in the Italian region of Marche between 15 and 16 September, mainly affecting the city of Ancona, where 12 people were killed and in other areas, 50 people were injured. One person is still missing. Afterwards, the system weakened and dissipated on 21 September.

Storm Bogdan (Ute) 

Storm Bogdan was named by the Italian Meteorological Service on 24 September. Weather warnings were also put in place in Greece. The system dissipated on 29 September.

Storm Clio 

On 25 September, Storm Clio was named by the Institute of Hydrometeorology and Seismology of Montenegro. The storm brought light rain and a moderate breeze to the country, however, the European Severe Storms Laboratory did not document any severe weather reports in Montenegro from Storm Clio.

Storm Dino

The storm dissipated on 6 October 2022.

Storm Bettina

Storm Bettina was named by the Deutscher Wetterdienst, the German meteorological agency on 7 October 2022. As Storm Bettina impacted Iceland on 9–10 October, the European Severe Storms Laboratory reported 181 storm reports, with 156 of those being severe wind reports of at least  and 25 heavy snowfall reports. Due to the storm, about 500 of RARIK's customers lost power. Dozens of reports of power transmissions being damaged or destroyed occurred on 9 October all around Iceland along with multiple reports of roads becoming impassable.

Storm Elke 

Storm Elke was named by the Deutscher Wetterdienst, the German meteorological agency on 14 October 2022. The Storm impacted Norway, Denmark, Sweden, Estonia and Russia on 16–17 October, uprooting trees, damaging houses, and causing power outages. On 16 October two IF1 tornadoes caused damage in Norway. The event was later classified as a derecho imbedded in Low Pressure System Elke instead of a European Windstorm by the European Severe Storms Laboratory. The storm entered the Arctic and dissipated on 21 October.

Storm Armand (Georgina) 

Storm Armand was named by the Portuguese Institute of the Sea and Atmosphere (IPMA) on 19 October. This system was named Georgina by the FUB. Expected to bring strong winds to the Iberian Peninsula, Armand also caused flooding and fallen trees. On 21 October, the storm approached France and the British Isles, causing strong gales and heavy rain. By 22 October, the storm had reached the tip of Scotland after significantly weakening. The storm then entered the North Sea and then looped back around again to Ireland when it dissipated on 23 October 2022.

The strongest high-level wind gusts from Armand were recorded on Mount Aigoual, France, reaching . Meanwhile, the strongest low-level wind gust from Armand was  recorded at Brignogan, France.

Storm Béatrice (Helgard II) 

A cold wave impulsed an extratropical cyclone in Europe and the storm interacted of anticyclone in the south in central Atlantic, the storm moved up towards Spain and Portugal, when on 22 October it received the name Beatrice. The system was named Helgard II by the FUB, and Helgard I went on into eastern Europe, as Helgard II did not affect eastern Europe. The storm then went on to bring heavy wind and rain to the Iberian Peninsula. The outer bands of this storm were also related to the supercells in northern France and southern England which produced at least 5 tornadoes, including the intense Bihucourt tornado.

A band of intense thunderstorms on the northern leading edge of Beatrice crossed southern and eastern England during the afternoon and evening of 23 October, where a yellow weather warning for thunderstorms was issued. Heavy rainfall and strong winds were reported widely, resulting in some flooding and structural damage, and flights were disrupted at Heathrow Airport for several hours.

A small girl was injured by a disjointed gate in a severe wind gust, On 27 October, the storm tracked north towards Iceland and dissipated.

Storm Cláudio (Karsta) 

Storm Cláudio was named on 31 October 2022. An orange alert for strong winds was put in place for four departments in northwest France. The Met Office issued a yellow weather warning for wind for most of the south coast of England, stretching from Weymouth to Kent. A trampoline that was caught underneath a train meant that no trains could run from Worthing to Hove for more than three hours. High winds caused part of the southwest corner of the West Pier in Brighton to collapse into the sea. Two giant silver baubles were blown down by the storm and rolled down Tottenham Court Road in London. However, no damage or injuries was reported.

Storm Cláudio hit the UK as a deepening low pressure system, the lowest onshore pressure of 994 hPa (29.35 inHg) was recorded in Plymouth at 22:00 on 31 October. The centre of the shortwave made landfall in Southern Wales, near Cardiff, at around midnight - with the storm further north than had initially been forecasted by both the Met Office and Météo-France. In the wake of Storm Cláudio heavy convective showers produced flash flooding and lightning across the Southwest of England on 1–2 November. In Devon, fire crews were called to a pre-school in Willand, Devon after a suspected lightning strike lead to a small fire at 14:40. Between the evening of the 31 October to the evening of the 2 November, more than 11,000 lightning strikes had been registered across the British Isles, with the majority of activity centred over the Channel Coasts.

Storm Marion 

A storm named Marion by the University of Berlin affected the British Isles on Wednesday 2 November and Thursday 3 November. The Met Office issued yellow weather warnings for wind and rain for 2 and 3 November, affecting large parts of Wales, northern England, Scotland and all of Northern Ireland.

Storm Eva (Ottilie) 

Storm Eva was named on 4 November 2022. Amber warnings were put in place for southern Italy, and red warnings were put in place for Greece.

Storm Philomena 

Storm Philomena was named on 7 November 2022.

Storm Regina

Storm Regina was named by the FUB on 14 November 2022. The storm passed through the United Kingdom on 17–18 November. The storm caused heavy rainfall in both Scotland and England.

Storm Fobos

Storm Fobos was named by the Institute of Hydrometeorology and Seismology of Montenegro on 19 November 2022. The storm dissipated on 24 November.

Storm Denise

Storm Denise was named by the AEMET on 21 November 2022. The storm caused wind gusts of more than  winds in Mallorca. In Venice, several schools were closed and water levels rose , the third most highest recording since modern records began. Stormy weather and roughs seas also affected areas in Sicily where ferry services were disrupted from the port at Milazzo. Heavy rain caused some flooding in the Province of Oristano in Sardinia on 22 November. Several people were evacuated in the small town of Bosa. Crashing waves, high tides and storm surge flooded shores along Italy's coastline. Coastal flooding was reported in the provinces of Rome and Latina in the Lazio Region. New Agency ANSA reported a tidal barrier was severely damaged in Ostia. Firefighters rescued families trapped in 1 metre deep floods in coastal areas near Anzio. On the Adriatic Coast, storm surge and high seas flooded coastal areas of Emilia-Romagna Region in the provinces of Forlì-Cesana, Ferrara, Rimini and Ravenna. Flooding was also reported in coastal areas of the Marche Region, including Marina di Montemarciano and Senigallia.

On 22 November, the storm made landfall in Italy. On 23 November, the storm made another landfall in the Balkans. On 25 November, the storm entered the Black Sea and the day after, the storm passed close to Ukraine and Russia. Denise dissipated on 27 November.

On 24 November, an Argentine tourist drowned after being swept into the sea in Furore, while a man was struck and killed by lightning on a beach in Vico Equense. The storm also partially triggered a landslide on the Italian Island of Ischia, killing 12 people.

The government has approved a state of emergency, allocating an initial sum of €2m (£1.7m) to help rebuild homes.

Storm Ariel (Yuki)

Storm Ariel was named by the Hellenic National Meteorological Service on 29 November 2022. The same system was named as Yuki by Deutscher Wetterdienst. Ariel caused power outages in many cities and islands. Several schools were closed in Skopelos. Ariel dissipated on 2 December 2022.

Storm Efraín

Storm Efraín was named on 10 December 2022. Crossing the cold waters heading towards the Azores and the Iberian Peninsula, a powerful anticyclone blocking its path to higher latitudes, the storm quickly intensified thanks to the presence of an atmospheric river of subtropical origin associated with its southern flank. The storm hit the Iberian Peninsula and France from 13 to 16 December before dissipating.

Efraín brought strong winds, heavy rains and rough seas to the Azores. Flooding due to heavy rains affected the provinces of Extremadura and Castilla-La Mancha in Spain. Strong gusts and rain caused landslides on the famous Caminito del Rey in Andalusia. Several stations in Madrid have been forced to close due to flooding. An environmental officer drowned during a flood in Villarino de los Aires (Salamanca).

In Portugal, Efraín caused flooding in the Tagus River basin. According to the Portuguese Civil Protection Agency, a government body, some 5,000 rescue workers were on duty across the country and authorities estimated the damage at millions of euros.

In France, the freezing rain and snow associated with the warm front of the system disrupted transport. Two accidents in Saône-et-Loire caused the death of a motorist on the A39 motorway and two truck drivers on a secondary road. The Minister of Transport, Clément Beaune, announced the cancellation of part of the flights from Orly and Roissy-Charles-de-Gaulle airports. In Lyon, all the buses remained stationary for part of a morning to avoid accidents.

Storm Gaia (Birgit)

Storm Gaia was named on 10 December 2022. In preparation, Greece issued warnings as trees fell and flooding caused by heavy rain occurred.

Storm Fien 

On 14 January 2023, the Spanish State Meteorological Agency (AEMet) assigned the name Fien to the depression then located on Newfoundland. It was moving towards the south of the British Isles. It reached the Bay of Biscay on 17 January. Then crossing into the Mediterranean, it passed over northern Italy on the 18th and turned northward to end up in the Baltic countries the following day. At 0:00 UTC on 20 January, Fien reached northwestern Russia.

Consequently, Orange marine weather warnings for high winds were issued by AEMET for 15 January for north-western Galicia province, with yellow marine wind warnings stretching all the way to the border with France in Basque.

In France, the southwest was affected during the night of 16 to 17 January. The rain caused flooding in places. Snow in Auvergne-Rhône-Alpes, Haute-Savoie and the Massif Central caused difficulties on the roads and forced the closure of schools. In Corsica, a landslide disrupted trains between Ajaccio and Bastia and ferries were canceled by Corsica Linea.

In Spain, almost the entire country has been put on high alert for high winds, heavy rain and snow, depending on altitude, as well as rough seas. In the north, rivers approached overflow level. An 80-year-old man who disappeared during the storm has been found dead in the port of the Basque town of Bermeo. In Sondika, emergency services rescued a bus full of children stuck on a flooded road. After its passage, arctic air gave way to very cold temperatures.

Storm Gérard (Gero)

Storm Gérard was named on 15 January 2023.

The storm brought strong wind gusts, sleet showers, snow showers, and abundant rainfall across the United Kingdom, Ireland, and Western Europe. Gérard caused strong winds and left at least 75,000 customers without electricity.

The minimum central pressure within Gérard was around 973 hPa (28.7 inHg).

Cyclone Hannelore (Jan)

Cyclone Hannelore was named on 19 January 2023. The storm was last noted on 28 January. According to the EUMETSAT, Hannelore was a Medicane.

Storm Barbara

Storm Barbara caused high winds in Israel that lasted until 8 February 2023, uprooting trees and sent flying debris, causing damage to buildings and cars. 
1 fatality occurred when a 20-year-old construction worker was killed when scaffolding collapsed in Ashdod. In addition to the fatality, 5 injuries were also attributed to the storm.

The storm also hampered rescue efforts after the 2023 Turkey-Syria earthquake. The storm dissipated on 8 February 2023.

Storm Isaack

Storm Isaack was named on 6 February 2023 by the AEMET. The storm dissipated on 8 February 2023.

Cyclone Helios

Cyclone Helios was named by the Malta Meteorological Office on 9 February 2023. The storm also impacted Sicily, where it led to the closure of Catania–Fontanarossa Airport. Yellow weather warnings were issued for Malta. As a result, people in Malta were advised to avoid the coasts as a result.

The storm caused flooding and it led to property damage throughout the Maltese Islands, including the collapse of a false ceiling at the Malta International Airport and a structure at Popeye Village being destroyed by a dislodged boulder. During the heavy rain, walls collapsed, damaging parked cars at Għarb and St. Paul's Bay, while the 17th-century Għajn Tuffieħa Tower was also damaged. Some boats capsized and a yacht ran aground at Mistra Bay. One minor injury was reported when an airport ceiling collapsed.

On 10 February 2023, Malta experienced its wettest February-day since 1938. 
A total of 140.4 millimeters was measured at Luqa.

According to meteo.it, Helios was a mediterranean tropical-like cyclone.

The cyclone dissipated on 11 February.

Storm Otto (Ulf)

Storm Otto was named by the Danish Meteorological Institute on 16 February 2023 and the UK's Met Office issued yellow warnings of wind in northern Scotland. Later, on 17 February 2023, the UK's yellow warning had been extended for the Borders and northeast England.

On 16 February, the Danish Meteorological Institute warned that Denmark could experience hurricane-force winds, and gusts of over 39 m/s (140 km/h).

The most severe conditions occurred northern Scotland, where a yellow wind warning was in place. The storm dissipated on 21 February.

Cyclone Juliette (Zakariyya)

Cyclone Juliette was named on 27 February 2023.

Heavy snow and large waves occurred in parts of Italy, Spain, and France, primarily Mallorca and the Belearic Islands.

Storm Kamiel

Storm Kamiel was named on 27 February 2023 by the IPMA.

Storm Larisa

On March 7, the Free University of Berlin began tracking a major low pressure system in the middle of the North Atlantic called Diethelm. Its development took place along the polar front, within a barometric trough aloft. Its central pressure was around 970 hPa on March 8. On March 9, Météo-France officially gave it the name Larisa as it approached Ireland while extending a warm front towards Benelux. It passed over England and at 00:00 UTC on the 10th, the center of Larisa was over the English Channel, extending an intense pressure gradient over all of France and the Cantabrian Sea. Larisa then traveled through northern France, Benelux and Germany before arriving in central Europe on March 11. The following day, the storm reached Finland and northwestern Russia before entering the Barents Sea on March 13.

In France, eleven departments have been placed on orange alert. Strong winds blew, in particular on the northern coasts, on the Massif Central and the Mediterranean coast. On March 10, Météo-France reported gusts of 100 to 120 km/h over the country with gusts of up to 150 km/h in the Corbières. Keraunos, the French thunderstorm and tornado observatory, and Météo-France reported gusts of 146 to 150 km/h in Saint-Paul-de-Fenouillet (Pyrénées-Orientales) and 125 km/h in Mouthoumet in the Aude. On the Normandy and Brittany coasts, the winds reached 130 km/h in Saint-Malo, the waves in Porspoder (Finistère) reached more than 16 meters and in Brittany, up to 4,600 households were deprived of electricity. Gusts of more than 100 km/h have been reported in Corsica and even up to 192 km/h at Cagnano and 154 km/h at Cap Sagro. Much wind damage was also reported in areas of maximum winds and the fall of a wall in the commercial area of Dury, near Amiens in the Somme, injured two people.

In the United Kingdom, the Met Office has issued a number of weather warnings for heavy snow followed by very cold temperatures. Significant snowfalls have been reported of up to 24 cm at Leek Thorncliffe and 14cm at Bingley in northern England, 16 cm at Lake Vyrnwy in Wales.. A village on the outskirts of Buxton (Derbyshire) received less than 30 cm of snow according to an unofficial source. The winds also caused blizzard conditions causing widespread disruption to road and rail traffic as well as the closure of hundreds of schools. On the British M62 motorway, between Manchester and Leeds, motorists have been stranded requiring the use of mountain rescue teams to come to their aid. Many flight delays and cancellations to clear snow from runways have been reported at airports.

In Ireland, a warning has been issued by Met Éireann for much of the country for freezing temperatures, widespread freezing on the roads as well as a snowfall warning. In Northern Ireland, more than 180 schools have been closed, mainly in Belfast and counties Antrim, Armagh and Down.

Storm Larisa brought snowfall to Belgium & Netherlands between 8–10 March 2023, with layers of snow up to 10 centimeters.

In Spain on March 8, warnings were issued for the Galician coast, predicting waves between 5 and 7 m in height. The next day they were extended until March 10 for the eastern Cantabrian Sea. The strongest gusts hit the Cantabrian coast, as well as mountainous areas in the north. The highest gust of 113 km/h was recorded at the Punta de Estaca de Bares (A Coruña) on March 10. Rainfall was significant in the province of Cáceres, with a maximum of 59 mm in Piornal in 24 hours.

Season effects

See also
Weather of: 2022, 2023
Tropical cyclones in 2023
2022–23 North American winter

References

E
E
E
E
European windstorms
E
E